Lila Clunas (born Maggie Eliza Clunas 10 August 1876 – 29 December 1968) was a Scottish suffragette and Labour party councillor. She was known as one of the leading suffragettes in Dundee.

Biography 
Lila Clunas was born in Glasgow on 10 August 1876, to parents Elsie Melvin and Hugh Clunas, a dress shop owner. Her sisters were Jessie and Elsie. She was schooled at Bell Baxter High School, Cupar, and completed her teacher training in Moray House Teacher Training College, Edinburgh. She then moved to Dundee where she taught at the Brown Street Elementary Public School. In later life, she lived with her sister Elsie in Broughty Ferry.

Political career 
In 1906, she joined the Women's Social and Political Union (WSPU). The following year, she joined the Women's Freedom League (WFL), serving as the secretary of the Dundee branch between 1908 –1912. Her sisters Elsie and Jessie Clunas were also members of the WFL, with Elsie serving as treasurer until 1913. She was succeeded as secretary by Helen Wilkie.

Her political activities included deputations, heckling and writing in the press. In 1908 she was expelled from an election meeting for Winston Churchill. In 1909, she was a member of a 9-woman delegation to the House of Commons. During a WSPU deputation at the end of June, she was arrested while presenting a petition to Prime Minister Asquith, although it has been suggested that she attempted to take a swipe at him. She was charged with obstruction and was sentenced to three weeks in prison. She was imprisoned in the London Holloway Prison, and was the first Dundee suffragette to be held there. She went on hunger strike, and was released early, "on consideration of all the circumstances and as an act of clemency".

Clunas tried on 11 September 1912 to get into the hall in Dundee where Winston Churchill was about to give a speech, but she was not allowed to enter. She then instead fastened a card on her chest and went to the Post Office. She asked to be delivered by express message to the prime minister's residence. In 1909 the suffragettes Daisy Solomon and Elspeth McLelland tried to do the same, which resulted in the issue of a statement to the post offices in the London region to not accept such actions. However, this instruction did not reach Scotland, so Clunas' request was accepted at the post office. But, just as in 1909, her attempt to be actually delivered was refused.

In 1914 she was ejected from a Ramsay MacDonald meeting, and this led to a split between the suffragettes and the Dundee Labour Party.

In 1943 she was elected as a Labour Party Councillor in the Dundee City Council, and served until 1964. She had a particular interest in education.

Clunas died 29 December 1968 in Dundee.

Memorials 
In 2008, the building that was Brown Street Elementary School was marked with a commemoration plaque in Clunas's honour.

See also 
 Women's Social and Political Union
Women's Freedom League
 Suffragette
 Women's suffrage in the United Kingdom

References 

Scottish suffragists
1876 births
1968 deaths
Politicians from Glasgow
Women councillors in Scotland
20th-century British women politicians
Scottish socialist feminists
Alumni of the University of Edinburgh
People educated at Bell Baxter High School
Hunger Strike Medal recipients
Councillors in Dundee
Scottish suffragettes